This is a list of 147 species in the genus Rivellia.

Rivellia species

References